Michael Lee Lewis (born November 14, 1971) is a former American football wide receiver and return specialist who is currently the team ambassador of the New Orleans Saints. He was signed by the Louisiana Bayou Beast in 1998. He did not play college football.

Lewis was also a member of the New Orleans Thunder, New Jersey Red Dogs, Philadelphia Eagles, New Orleans Saints, San Francisco 49ers and New Orleans VooDoo.

Early years
Lewis graduated from Grace King High School in Metairie, Louisiana in 1990. Despite being a promising athlete, Lewis only played football during his freshman year before quitting to help his family with their rough financial situation by getting a job. He became a father during his senior year of high school and chose to focus on supporting his newborn child instead of playing football or going to college.

Professional career

Early career
Prior to his pro football career, Lewis was a Budweiser beer truck driver (thus, the nickname "Beer Man") whose truck route was a short distance from the Mercedes-Benz Superdome. In his early 20's, a friend introduced Lewis to an amateur flag football league that was having open tryouts. After seeing extreme success in flag football, Lewis decided to pursue his dream of playing pro football and waded through the various semi-professional football leagues, pro indoor leagues, and the Arena Football League, amassing impressive stats that resulted in him getting invites to various NFL training camps.

Philadelphia Eagles 
Lewis was signed by the Philadelphia Eagles during the preseason in 2000. He was cut before the regular season began.

New Orleans Saints
Lewis returned to his hometown to deliver beer locally. However, the New Orleans Saints signed Lewis at the end of the 2000 NFL regular season. The Saints sent Lewis to play for the Rhein Fire of NFL Europe in 2001.

Lewis was the Saints' feature return specialist from 2002 until September 19, 2005 during a game against the New York Giants at the Meadowlands, when he injured his MCL and was put on injured reserve for the rest of the season. Lewis returned to play for the Saints on October 29, 2006 during a home game against the Baltimore Ravens.

In 2002, Lewis set an NFL record for combined kick-punt return yardage with 2,432 yards total (1,807 kickoff, 625 punt), leading the league in punt return yards, kickoff return yards, and all-purpose yards. He is currently the Saints' all-time career leader in punt returns (142) and punt return yardage (1,482).

On December 21, 2003, he also played a role in the River City Relay as one of the receivers that would lateral a touchdown in a last second attempt to win the game against the Jacksonville Jaguars (in which the Saints lost). The River City Relay won an ESPY, NFL play of the year, and an ESPN.com internet poll.

In April 2006 Lewis returned to the Saints after recovering from a knee injury.

The Saints released Lewis on June 15, 2007. The local New Orleans newspaper, the Times-Picayune, titled the news, "There's a Tear in My Beer".

San Francisco 49ers

On September 25, 2007, the San Francisco 49ers signed Lewis to take over punt return duties. The incumbent punt returner, Brandon Williams, was released.

New Orleans VooDoo
Lewis signed a contract with the New Orleans VooDoo on October 10, 2008. Team officials were preparing to make the announcement the following week, but the owner (Tom Benson, also the owner of the New Orleans Saints) decided to terminate operations on October 13, 2008.

Post-retirement
Lewis subsequently took a position as a "Team Ambassador" for the Saints.  Though no longer an active player, Lewis was awarded a Super Bowl ring after the Saints won Super Bowl XLIV in recognition of his continuing role with the team. Lewis was selected for the Saints Hall of Fame in 2015. In 2019, it was announced that biopic about Michael Lewis's life was being produced under the name "The Beer Man" with Aldis Hodge attached to the lead role.

NFL career statistics
Receiving Stats
Returning Stats

Awards and honors
 New Orleans Saints Hall of Fame (2015)
 2011 American Football Association Semi Pro Hall of Fame
 2004 NFC Special Teams Player of the Week (Week 16)
 2002 NFL Pro Bowl
 Associated Press First-team All-Pro
 2002 NFC Special Teams Player of the Week (Week 6)
 NFL Alumni Special Teams Player of the Year
 Sports Illustrated All-Pro
 College & Pro Football Newsweekly First-team All-Pro
 Pro Football Weekly All-NFL and All-NFC
 Football Digest First-team All-Pro
 The Sporting News All-Pro
 2000 AFL All-Rookie Team
 1998 PIFL All-Star First-team

References

External links

 American Football Association Hall of Fame
 NFL Pro Bowler Michael Lewis Selected for Induction Into Semi-Pro Football Hall Of Fame - “Class Of 2011"
 San Francisco 49ers bio

1971 births
Living people
African-American players of American football
Players of American football from New Orleans
American football return specialists
American football wide receivers
Grace King High School alumni
Regional Football League players
New Jersey Red Dogs players
Philadelphia Eagles players
New Orleans Saints players
Rhein Fire players
San Francisco 49ers players
National Conference Pro Bowl players
21st-century African-American sportspeople
20th-century African-American sportspeople